Kula-Salihli Geopark, also known as Kula Volcanic Geopark and Kula Geopark, ( or Kula Jeoparkı) is a geopark, a protected area of geological heritage,  located in Kula and Salihli districts of Manisa Province, western Turkey. It was recognized by UNESCO as a UNESCO Global Geopark in 2013, and is the country's only geopark.

Location
The volcanic park is located in Manisa Province in western Turkey, covering an area of nearly  mainly in Kula district, and stretches in the north into parts of Salihli district.

History
The volcanic field was first described by the Ancient Greek geographer Strabo (64 or 63 BC – c. 24 AD) in the encyclopedia Geographica, calling it Katakekaumene. The name means "burnt land" or "burnt country", and refers to the pitch-black color of the lava in the dormant volcanic field Kula. The volcanic field attracted many travelers and researchers, including George Keppel (1830), William Hamilton and Hugh Edwin Strickland (1841), Charles Texier, Bresh and Anton von Premerstein (1891), Henry Stephens Washington (1900) and Alfred Philippson (1914).

Geopark
In November 2011, an application was made to the European Geoparks Network and UNESCO. Kula Geopark became Turkey's first geopark candidate of European Geoparks Network and UNESCO in March 2013. In September 2013, it was accepted as the country's first and only geopark by the European and the UNESCO-assisted Global Geoparks Network.

In June 2013, the geopark was opened to tourism after construction of facilities including walkways and a visitor center. The visitor center is an information center for tourists and a natural history museum for education in geology.

Geology
The geological structure of the geopark is of a complex nature and is caused by the active tectonics of the Aegean region. It is one of the geologically youngest volcanic fields in Turkey. Three phases of eruption took place in the volcanism of the Quaternary period, some 1.1 million, 300 thousand and 15 thousand years ago.

Cones and craters

There are 80 scoria cones and five maars in the geopark. The height of the small-sized scoria cones does not exceed .

Lava caves and lava tubes
Lava tubes or caves were formed by lava flow along its way. Lava tubes are formed when an active low-viscosity lava flow solidifies and forms a hard crust roof above the still-flowing lava stream. While some lava caves are easily accessible, others can be entered only with specialized caving equipment.

Basalt columns
Characteristic basalt columns, called "Burgaz volcanics" (tower volcanics) are formed in the first stage of lava flow. When thick lava flow cools rapidly, contraction forces build up. While shrinking in the vertical direction does not form fractures, a network of fractures formed by horizontal shrinkage develop basalt columns.

Hoodoos

There are hoodoos situated on the İzmir-Ankara state highway D300/E96 near Yurtbaşı village. They are formed when relatively soft rock is topped by harder stone; the softer rock is washed away by atmospheric factors, leaving a capping of the harder material which is more resistant to erosion. The formation process is ongoing, and while some hoodoos fall down, new ones are being formed.

Prehistoric footprints
In 1954, during road construction works near the Çakallar Volcanic Cone, more than 200 fossilized footprints were unearthed. Only a few of these footprints remain on the scene. It is considered that the footprints belong to three people walking on a slope. The age analyses indicate that the footprints are 10,000–12,000 years old corresponding to the Mesolithic Anatolia. These traces, which bear witness to one of the oldest interactions of human and active volcanoes in Anatolia are very important for scientific and educational reasons.

References

External links 

Geoparks in Turkey
Tourist attractions in Manisa Province
Protected areas established in 2013
2013 establishments in Turkey
Volcanic fields
Kula, Manisa
Salihli